Pilsner (also pilsener or simply pils) is a type of pale lager. It takes its name from the Bohemian city of Plzeň, where the world's first pale lager (now known as Pilsner Urquell) was produced in 1842 by Pilsner Urquell Brewery.

History

Origin
The city of Plzeň was granted brewing rights in 1307, but until the mid-1840s, most Bohemian beers were top-fermented. It was here they began to brew beer in the Bavarian style.

Brewers had begun aging beer made with cool fermenting yeasts in caves (lager, i.e.,  [stored]), which improved the beer's clarity and shelf-life. Part of this research benefited from the knowledge already expounded on in a book (printed in German in 1794, in Czech in 1799), written by Czech brewer  (1753–1805) from Brno.

The Plzeň brewery recruited the Bavarian brewer Josef Groll (1813–1887) who, using the local ingredients, produced the first batch of pale lager on 5 October 1842. The combination of Plzeň's remarkably soft water, local Saaz noble hops from nearby Žatec, low-protein Moravian barley malt prepared by indirectly heated kilning, and Bavarian-style lagering produced a clear, golden beer. 

By 1853, the beer was available at 35 pubs in Prague. In 1856, it came to Vienna and in 1862 to Paris. In 1859,  was registered as a brand name at the Chamber of Commerce and Trade in Plzeň. In 1898, the Pilsner Urquell trademark was created to put emphasis on being the original brewery (Urquell, meaning 'original source').

Some beers are labeled Urtyp Pilsener (UP) meaning they are brewed according to the original process, although many breweries use this accolade for their top beer.

Modern developments
The introduction of modern refrigeration to Germany by Carl von Linde in the late 19th century eliminated the need for caves for beer storage, enabling the brewing of cool fermenting beer in many new locations.

Until 1993 the Pilsner Urquell brewery fermented its beer using open barrels in the cellars beneath their brewery. This changed in 1993 with the use of large cylindrical tanks. Small samples are still brewed in a traditional way for taste comparisons.

A modern pale lager termed a pilsner may have a very light, clear colour from pale to golden yellow, with varying levels of hop aroma and flavour. The alcohol strength of beers termed pilsner vary but are typically around 4.5%–5% (by volume). There are categories such as "European-Style Pilsner" at beer competitions such as the World Beer Cup. Pilsner style lagers are marketed internationally by numerous small brewers and larger conglomerates.

Styles

Czech-style PilsnerIn the Czech Republic, only Pilsner Urquell is named as "pilsner". However, outside of the Czech Republic, Czech-style Pilsner is synonymous with any lager beers (including any Czech brand) that are golden colour, brewed with malt and Saaz hops – such as Pilsner Urquell, Budweiser Budvar, Gambrinus, Kozel, Radegast, Staropramen, Starobrno and Krušovice.

German-style PilsnerLight straw to golden colour with more bitter or earthy taste – such as Beck's, Bitburger, Flensburger, Fürstenberg, Holsten, Jever, König, Krombacher, Radeberger, St. Pauli Girl, Veltins, Warsteiner, Wernesgrüner and Einbecker.

European-style PilsnerHas a slightly sweet taste, can be produced from grains other than barley malt – such as the Dutch: Amstel, Grolsch and Heineken or Belgian: Jupiler, Maes and Stella Artois

American-style Pilsner German immigrants brought pilsner style beers to America in the mid-19th century. American pilsners today are still closer to the German style, but the grist contains up to 25% corn and/or rice. The style generally has medium-low to medium sweet malt flavor, and medium to high European hop notes.

See also
Beer by region

References

External links

Gesellschaft für Geschichte des Brauwesens e.V. (GGB)
Die Kunst des Bierbrauens

Beer styles
Beer in the Czech Republic
German beer styles
Plzeň
Types of beer